The Last Man on Earth is a 2011 Italian science fiction drama film directed by Gian Alfonso Pacinotti. Its original Italian title is L'ultimo terrestre, which means "The last earthling". The story follows a man with relational problems while aliens visit Earth. The film premiered in competition at the 68th Venice International Film Festival.

Cast
 Gabriele Spinelli as Luca Bertacci
 Anna Bellato as Anna Luini
 Luca Marinelli as Roberta
 Teco Celio as Giuseppe Geri
 Stefano Scherini as the American
 Roberto Herlitzka as Luca's father
 Paolo Mazzarelli as Walter Rasini
 Sara Rosa Losilla as alien
 Vincenzo Illiano as Gabriele Del Genovese
 Ermanna Montanari as Carmen
 Leonardo Taddei as Customer

Production
Fandango produced the film in collaboration with Rai Cinema and the Toscana Film Commission. The production involved a budget of 2.3 million euro. Filming took place in Tuscany during five weeks.

Release
To market the film, a viral video was released on the Internet where the real RAI newsreader Maria Cuffaro announces that extraterrestrials have arrived on Earth. The film premiered on 8 September 2011 in competition at the 68th Venice International Film Festival. Italian distribution is handled by Fandango, and the regular release is set to 9 September.

The film has been released on DVD and Blu-ray in Italy on 17 January 2012.

References

External links
 Official website 
 

2010s science fiction drama films
2011 films
Films based on Italian comics
Films set in Pisa
Films shot in Italy
2010s Italian-language films
Italian science fiction drama films
Live-action films based on comics
2011 directorial debut films
2011 drama films
2010s Italian films
Fandango (Italian company) films